Giovanni Battista Marenco SDB, more often known as Giovanni Marenco (27 April 1853 – 22 October 1921) was an Italian prelate of the Catholic Church who worked in the Roman Curia, led an Italian diocese briefly, and then joined the diplomatic service of the Holy See.

Biography
Giovanni Marenco was born on 27 April 1853 in Ovada, Italy. He joined the Salesians of Don Bosco in 1873 and was ordained a priest as a member of that order on 18 December 1875. He headed various Salesian houses and in 1890 he was appointed provincial of the Ligurian province. In 1892 he served as the rector major's delegate to the Salesian Sisters. In 1899 he was named procurator general of the order.

He was attached to the Congregation of the Council and a consultor to the Congregation for Religious when, on 29 April 1909, Pope Pius X named him Bishop of Massa Carrara. He received his episcopal consecration on 16 May 1909 from Cardinal Francesco di Paolo Satolli.

On 7 January 1917, Pope Benedict XV appointed him titular archbishop of Edessa in Macedonia, and on 2 February he was named Apostolic Internuncio to Costa Rica, Honduras, and Nicaragua,

Marenco returned to Italy because of illness and died in Turin on 22 October 1921 at the age of 68.

Notes

References

1853 births
1921 deaths
People from Ovada
Officials of the Roman Curia
Salesian bishops
Apostolic Nuncios to Costa Rica
Apostolic Nuncios to Nicaragua
Apostolic Nuncios to Honduras
Bishops of Edessa